Anthony Jessup (31 August 1928 – 19 December 1996) was an English first-class cricketer.

Jessup was born in August 1928 at Blindley Heath. He later studied at Jesus College at the University of Oxford. While studying at Oxford, he played first-class cricket for Oxford University against the Free Foresters at Oxford in 1950. He played first-class cricket for Oxford until 1951, making a total of seven appearances. Playing as a slow left-arm orthodox bowler, he took a total of 19 wickets at an average of 22.73. He took a five wicket haul on three occasions and ten wickets in a match one, with best figures of 5 for 30 on debut against the Free Foresters.  He took ten wickets in total in this match. Jessup died at Kensington in December 1996.

References

External links

1928 births
1996 deaths
People from Godstone
Alumni of Jesus College, Oxford
English cricketers
Oxford University cricketers